Murappennu is a 1965 Malayalam-language drama film directed by A. Vincent and written by M. T. Vasudevan Nair. The film stars Prem Nazir in the lead role with an ensemble supporting cast including Sharada, Madhu, Jyothilakshmi, K. P. Ummer, P. J. Antony, Jyothilakshmi and Adoor Bhasi playing the pivotal roles. The film revolves around a joint family and the romantic relationships between the cousins of the family. The film explores the Indian custom of marriage between cousins.

The film was produced and distributed by Shobhana Parameswaran Nair under the banner of Roopavani Films. It marked the debut of M. T. Vasudevan Nair, the noted Malayalam novelist to Malayalam cinema. The film's story is based on Snehathinte Mukhangal, a short story by Nair himself. He wrote the screenplay, at the behest of the producer. Murappennu became the first Malayalam film to be shot predominantly outdoors; Malayalam films were primarily filmed in Satya or Udaya Studios. Its soundtrack album and background score were composed by Chidambaranath, with cinematography by A. Venkat.

Murappennu was released on 24 December 1965, during the Christmas holiday period. The film was released to high expectations, the film received critical praise for Nair's script, Chidambaranath's music and the performances of Nazir, Madhu and Sharada. It was also commercially successful, with a 175-day theatrical run, becoming a silver jubilee hit. It won the Certificate of Merit for the Third Best Feature Film at the 13th National Film Awards. The film was the first part of Nair's trilogy of political melodramas – the other two being P. Bhaskaran's Iruttinte Athmavu (1967) and Vincent's Asuravithu (1968).

Cast 
Prem Nazir as Balan 
K. P. Ummer as Aniyan
Madhu as Kesavankutty
Sharada as Bhagirathi
Jyothi Lakshmi as Kochammini
P. J. Antony as Kunjikrishna Menon
Sukumari as Mrs.Menon
Shanta Devi as Madhavi Amma
Kunjandi as Kuttappa Menon
Adoor Bhasi
Murali as Chandran
S. P. Pillai
Nellikode Bhaskaran as Veerankutty
Nilambur Balan as Chathan
Baby Vrinda as Minikkutty, Menon's grand daughter

Soundtrack
The songs became popular and is regarded as one of the best works by Chidambaranath. Three of its songs, "Karayunno Puzha Chirikkunno" (by K. J. Yesudas), "Kaliyaakki Enne Kaliyaakki" (by S. Janaki) and "Kadavathu Thoniyadukkumbol" (by S. Janaki and Santha P. Nair) became evergreen hits. "Kadavathu Thoniyadukkumbol" was inspired by "Janoo Janoo Ri Kaahe Khanke Tora Kangana" (composer: S D Burman, singers: Geeta Dutt & Asha Bhonsle, film: Insan Jaag Utha (1959), which itself was based on a "chhed chhaad" style folk song. The song "Karayunno Puzha Chirikkunno" was described by The Hindu as one of the greatest melodies of all time in Malayalam cinema.

Release 
Murappennu was released on 24 December 1965. The film was a major commercial success, with a theatrical run of over 175 days. In 2009, B. Vijayakumar of The Hindu wrote, "The film stood out for some superb acting by Prem Nazir, P. J. Antony, newcomer Jyothilakhsmi and Sharada." Further writing, "The scenes presented by Adoor Bhasi, S. P. Pillai and Kunjava provided comic relief. Other than aiming at the box office there was no justification in the inclusion of these scenes and characters in an otherwise serious film. These characters did not connect with the main storyline." He then, praised the script's use of the Valluvanadan dialect throughout the film. The film's soundtrack was also successful. On 2009, P. K. Ajithkumar wrote, "Nazir has often been dismissed, sometimes too easily, as just a star and not an actor. But even his harshest critics could not have ignored his powerful performance in Murappennu."

Legacy 
The Hindu described Murappennu as "a well-made film with a compelling plot" and as "one of the most significant films in the history of Malayalam cinema". This was seen as M. T. Vasudevan Nair's breakthrough in Malayalam cinema and is accepted to be one of the finest of M. T. Vasudevan Nair's works. Writing for The Hindu, B. Vijayakumar, wrote "M. T. Vasudevan Nair and A. Vincent went on to create some of the memorable films in Malayalam film history." Jaycey Foundation chairman and film producer J.J. Kuttikkattu had conducted an event to celebrate the 50th anniversary of the film.

References

External links
 

1960s Malayalam-language films
1965 films
1960s romance films
Indian romance films
Films with screenplays by M. T. Vasudevan Nair
Films directed by A. Vincent